Canada ranks among the highest in international measurements of government transparency, civil liberties, quality of life, economic freedom, education levels, gender equality,  public services, public security and environmental sustainability. It ranks among the lowest of the most developed countries for housing affordability, healthcare services and  foreign direct investment.

International rankings

Worldwide rankings 
According to the United Nations (U.N.), the generally recognized body which determines nationhood, there are 193 recognized countries with an overall total of 208 including 2 observer states, and 13 states with limited recognition. Note: Below each survey uses a limited number of countries/region's for its assessments, see "Measurement(s)" for number variables.

Freedom assessments

The freedom indices produced by several non-governmental organizations publishes assessments of political rights and civil liberties for countries around the world.

Lowest rankings of  the most developed countries 

A developed country (or industrialized country) has a high quality of life, developed economy and advanced technological infrastructure relative to other less industrialized nations. Note: Below each survey uses a limited number of countries for its assessment, see "Notes" for country number variables.

See also

Canadian values
Censorship in Canada
Economy of Canada
Freedom of expression in Canada
Freedom of religion in Canada
Healthcare in Canada
Human rights in Canada
 LGBT rights in Canada
 Women's rights in Canada

References

Further reading

External links
International Rankings (Canada) - The Conference Board of Canada
Global Benchmarking Database - University of Warwick 
Canada international rankings - Rankedex
Country rankingss - TheGlobalEconomy.com
 Canada profile -  OECD

Canada